Barren Township is a township in Independence County, Arkansas, United States. Its total population was 1,483 as of the 2010 United States Census, an increase of 17.79 percent from 1,259 at the 2000 census.

According to the 2010 Census, Barren Township is located at  (35.899617, -91.542150).

Part of Cave City is located within the township.

References

External links 

Townships in Arkansas
Populated places in Independence County, Arkansas